Tânia Mara is the first album by the Brazilian singer Tânia Mara, released in September 2006 by EMI. It includes two singles: "Se Quiser" (a cover version of Kelly Clarkson's 2003 song "Anytime"), which became an airplay hit in Brazil due to its inclusion on the soundtrack to the telenovela Páginas da Vida, and "Febre de Amor".

Track listing
"Se Quiser"
"Um Tempo de Paixão"
"A Primeira Vez"
"Limousine Grana Suja"
"Sua Estupidez"
"Meus Planos"
"Não Me Deixe Sozinha Aqui"
"Esta Noite Eu Vou Chorar"
"Febre de Amor"
"Mar de Gente"
"O Maior Amor" 
"O Que Eu Sinto"

2006 debut albums
Tânia Mara albums
EMI Records albums